Mark Mercedes is an  Australian professional wrestler and promoter, currently owning and promoting the International Wrestling Australia he was one of the few Australians to wrestle for World Championship Wrestling and World Wrestling All-Stars.

Professional wrestling career

Early years and training
He became an amateur wrestler when he was 18 and shortly won the City of Sydney, New South Wales State and Australian Championships and competed in Olympic game trials then gained his initial professional wrestling training at the Malenko's Wrestling School in Florida in 1992.

International exploits

World Championship Wrestling
In 1993 he worked on WCW Saturday Night and WCW WorldWide and wrestled Rick Rude on WCW Television Programs he also performed on WCW Monday Nitro and wrestled Rick Martel in front of 30,000 fans at the Georgia Dome in Atlanta. Mercedes performed in dark matches on the 2000 WCW Australian Tour.

Europe
Mercedes wrestled for Catch Wrestling Association on a seven-month tour in 1997

New Zealand and World Wrestling All-Stars
In 1993 Mercedes was on the New Zealand Grand Prix National Wrestling Tour and he appeared on a worldwide pay-per-view event WWA: The Reckoning and lost to Rick Steiner.

Japan
He went on tour with Muga World Pro Wrestling now known as Dradition Pro-Wrestling in 2006 and 2007

Championships and accomplishments
Australian Championship Wrestling
ACW Australian Heavyweight Championship (1 time)
 International Wrestling Australia
 IWA Heavyweight Championship (12 times)
 IWA Tag Team Championship (1 time)
 IWA Trans Tasman Championship (2 times)
 IWA South Pacific Heavyweight Championship (1 time)
 Pro Wrestling Illustrated
Ranked No. 396 of the top 500 singles wrestlers in the PWI 500 in 2002

References

External links
 
 

Year of birth missing (living people)
Living people
Sportspeople from Sydney
Sportsmen from New South Wales
Australian male sport wrestlers
Australian male professional wrestlers
Professional wrestling trainers
Professional wrestling promoters